Nichols station (formerly Bonifacio–Villamor station, and from 2028 to be referred as Senate station) is a railway station located on the South Main Line in Taguig, Metro Manila, Philippines. It derives its name from one of the area's popular nicknames, Nichols, which is also the former name of Villamor Air Base. It was opened for revenue service on March 25, 2010.

Nearby landmarks
Aside being near both Villamor Airbase and Fort Bonifacio, it is also near Terminal 3 of Ninoy Aquino International Airport, Newport City, the headquarters of the Technical Education and Skills Development Authority (TESDA) and the Libingan ng mga Bayani.  Further away from the station are the Philippine State College of Aeronautics, the Pasay City South High School, Magallanes Village in Makati, the Manila American Cemetery and Memorial, The Heritage Memorial Park, the Bonifacio Global City,  McKinley Hill, and McKinley West.

Transportation links
Nichols station is accessible by jeepneys plying routes on the East Service Road, Lawton Avenue (the road which leads to Fort Bonifacio) and Sales Road (the road which leads to Villamor Airbase), as well as buses plying these routes.

Future
This station shall be rebuilt as part of the North–South Commuter Railway project. A new station shall be built to the north of the Sales Interchange where the present one is. To be named Senate station, it will be constructed behind the Department of Social Welfare and Development's SWADCAP site. The station building will be built at-grade and will have two tracks and side platforms. It shall serve the new Senate of the Philippines building, along with the Metro Manila Subway station of the same name. However, these two stations are not expected to be part of a single interchange. The entire NSCR system which includes the new Senate station, is expected to open by 2028.

Station Layout

References

Philippine National Railways stations
Railway stations in Metro Manila
Railway stations opened in 2010
Buildings and structures in Taguig